was a Japanese avant-garde filmmaker and fine artist. He is considered one of the pioneers of experimental and independent filmmaking in Japan. Iimura was born in Tokyo and was a graduate of Keio University. His film Onan (1963) won the Special Prize at the Brussels International Independent Film Festival in 1964. He published a seminal work on experimental filmmaking in 1970, Geijutsu to higeijutsu no aida, and a biography of Yoko Ono, Ono Yōko hito to sakuhin, in 1985. Iimura made much of his film in New York City, but became a professor at the Nagoya Zokei University of Art & Design in 1992.

Filmography

1960s
"Film Poems," (1962–1970, 16mm)
"Iro" (Colors), (1962, 16mm (from 8mm), Music: Yasunao Tone, 8 min.)
Onan (1963, 16mm, B/W, 7min., Music: Yasunao Tone; Winner, Special Prize, Brussels International Film Festival)
"Taka and Ako," (1966, 16mm (from 8mm), black and white, silent, 16fps, 15 min.)
"White Calligraphy," (1967, 16mm, black and white, silent, 11 min.)
"Filmmakers," (1968, 28 min.)

1970s
"Kiri" (Fog), (1970, 16mm (from 8mm), black and white, silent, 16fps, 7 min.)
"Film Strips I," (1970, 16mm, black and white, silent, 11.5 min.)
"The Pacific Ocean" (1971, 16mm, colour, silent, 11 min.)
"Self Identity" (1972, 1 min.)
"Double Portrait" (1973–1987, 5 min.)
"I Love You" (1973–1987, 4.5 min.)
"Double Identity" (1979, 1.5 min.)

1980s
"I Am A Viewer, You Are A Viewer" (1981, 4 min.)
"This Is A Camera Which Shoots This" (1982–1995, 5 min.)
"Air’s Rock" (portmanteau, DVD, including Moments at the Rock, (1984, color, sound, 12 min.) and A Rock in the Light (1985/2008, 18 min. Music: Haruyuki Suzuki, 2008))
New York Hotsprings (1984, DVD, b/w, 10 min. Part of Experiments in New York)
"TV Confrontation" (1986, DVD, color, stereo, 5 min. with Tetsuya fukui, "Video=Aleph") 
New York Day and Night (1989, DVD, color, Music: Takehisa Kosugi, 58 min.)

1990s
"As I See You You See Me" (1990–1995, 7 min.)
PERFORMANCE/MYSELF (Or Video Identity) (portmanteau, 1972–1995, DVD, 7 pieces, total 29 min.)

References

External links 
 
 Speaking Engagement

1937 births
2022 deaths
Japanese film directors
Japanese experimental filmmakers
Japanese video artists
American experimental filmmakers
American video artists
Artists from Tokyo
Keio University alumni